Shadmorad Mahalleh (also Romanized as Shādmorād Maḩalleh; also known as Shāhmorād Maḩalleh) is a village in Chehel Shahid Rural District, in the Central District of Ramsar County, Mazandaran Province, Iran. At the 2006 census, its population was 313, in 79 families.

References 

Populated places in Ramsar County